Gloria Anna Holden (September 5, 1903 – March 22, 1991) was an English-born American film actress, best known for her role as Dracula's Daughter. She often portrayed cold society women.

Early life
Holden was born in London, England. She emigrated to the United States as a child with her parents, Charles Laurence Sutherland and Eska (née Bergmann). Her mother was German. She attended school in Wayne, Pennsylvania, and later studied at New York's American Academy of Dramatic Arts. Before she became an actress, she modeled for artists, was a shopper for a store, and worked in a beauty salon. In her early teens, living in suburban Philadelphia (Gladwyne), she took voice lessons from Philip Warren Cook and was a church chorister in Ardmore and, later, Overbrook.

Theatre
Holden's early stage work included small parts in plays such as The Royal Family, in which she spoke four lines playing a nurse. She was an understudy to Mary Ellis in Children of Darkness, and had a minor role in That Ferguson Family. She was an understudy for Brass Ankle (1931), had a bit part in The Desert Song (1926), and succeeded Lilly Cahill in As Husbands Go at the John Golden Theatre on Broadway, in June 1931. In August 1932, Holden was part of the cast of Manhattan Melody at the Longacre Theatre. The Lawrence Hazard play, adapted by L. Lawrence Weber, also featured Helen Lowell, Minnie Dupree and William Corbett as players. She was the leading lady in Survivor (1933), written by D.L. James. Holden was among the cast members in Memory (1933), a Myron Fagan play. 

Holden was active in stock theater in Cincinnati, Ohio; Princeton, New Jersey; and Scarborough, New York.

Films
She may be best remembered for two roles in her long career, that of Mme. Zola in The Life of Emile Zola (1937), and her "exotic" depiction of the title role in Dracula's Daughter (1936). Her performance in the latter influenced the writings of horror novelist Anne Rice, and Dracula's Daughter is directly mentioned in Rice's novel The Queen of the Damned. In July 1937, Holden was assigned to play the character of Marian Morgan in The Man Without a Country (1937). The Technicolor short co-starred John Litel and was nominated for a Short Subject (Color) Academy Award. Her film career ended with This Happy Feeling (1958).

Radio
Holden performed on Eddie Cantor's radio program for 26 weeks  and played a non-singing Julie La Verne on the 1940 Lux Radio Theatre adaptation of Show Boat, based on the 1936 film version.

Personal life
Holden married Harold A. Winston on December 17, 1932; the couple divorced on December 2, 1937. In 1944, she married her third husband, William Hoyt, to whom she remained married until her death. They had one son, William Christopher Hoyt, who was born in 1948 and killed in an automobile accident in 1970, listed as a homicide.

Holden died at Redlands hospital of a myocardial infarction in 1991, aged 87.

Legacy
Harold Winston, who is credited with helping discover actor William Holden, named him in honor of Gloria Holden. A version of how William Holden obtained his stage name is based on a statement by George Ross of Billboard magazine: "William Holden, the lad just signed for the coveted lead in Golden Boy, used to be Bill Beadle. And here is how he obtained his new movie tag. On the Columbia lot is an assistant director and scout named Harold Winston. Not long ago he was divorced from the actress, Gloria Holden, but carried the torch after the marital rift. Winston was one of those who discovered the "Golden Boy" newcomer and who renamed him—in honor of his former spouse!..."

Partial filmography

 The Return of Chandu (1934, Serial) - Party Guest [Ch. 1] (uncredited)
 Wife vs. Secretary (1936) - Joan Carstairs
 Dracula's Daughter (1936) - Countess Marya Zaleska (Dracula's Daughter)
 The Life of Emile Zola (1937) - Alexandrine Zola
 Hawaii Calls (1938) - Mrs. Milburn
 Test Pilot (1938) - Mrs. May Benson
 Girls' School (1938) - Miss Laurel
 Dodge City (1939) - Mrs. Cole
 Miracles for Sale (1939) - Madame Rapport
 A Child Is Born (1939) - Mrs. Kempner
 This Thing Called Love (1940) - Genevieve Hooper
 Passage from Hong Kong (1941) - Madame Wrangell
 The Corsican Brothers (1941) - Countess Franchi
 A Gentleman After Dark (1942) - Miss Clark
 Miss Annie Rooney (1942) - Esther White
 Apache Trail (1942) - Mrs. James V. Thorne
 Behind the Rising Sun (1943) - Sara Braden
 Strange Holiday (1945) - Mrs. (Jean) Stevenson
 The Girl of the Limberlost (1945) - Phyllis Gray
 Adventures of Rusty (1945) - Louise Hover
 Hit the Hay (1945) - Mimi Valdez
 Strange Holiday (1946) - Mrs. McDonnell (uncredited)
 Undercover Maisie (1947) - Mrs. Guy Canford
 The Hucksters (1947) - Mrs. Kimberly
 Killer McCoy (1947) - Mrs. Laura McCoy
 Precious Waters (1948) - Mrs. Ferris
 The Sickle or the Cross (1949) - Louise Cannon
 A Kiss for Corliss (1949) - Mrs. Janet Archer
 Has Anybody Seen My Gal? (1952) - Clarissa Pennock
 Dream Wife (1953) - Mrs. Jean Landwell
 The Eddy Duchin Story (1956) - Mrs. Duchin
 This Happy Feeling (1958) - Mrs. Dover
 Auntie Mame (1958) - Guest at Garden Party (uncredited) (final film role)

References

Sources
The New York Times, "In The Summer Spotlight", June 14, 1931, p. X3.
New York Times, "Theatrical Notes", August 27, 1932, p. 13.
New York Times, "16 New Plays Open In Byways Tonight", August 14, 1933, p. 18.
New York Times, "Theatrical Notes", January 27, 1934, p. 8.
New York Times, "Listing The Week's New Shows", July 21, 1935, p. X1.
Zanesville Signal, "Liberty Horror Film", June 23, 1936, p. 11.
Los Angeles Times, "New Film Productions Started In Last Week". February 2, 1936, p. C1.
Los Angeles Times, "The Pageant of The Film World", July 14, 1937, p. 13.
Los Angeles Times, "Around And About In Hollywood", October 4, 1937, p. A9
Los Angeles Times, "Town Called Hollywood", August 21, 1938, p. C1.
Los Angeles Times, "Troupe Treks To Modesto Location", November 11, 1938, p. 10.
Los Angeles Times, "Jap Treachery Background of Screen Drama", September 11, 1943, p. 7.

External links

 
 Gloria Holden filmography, nytimes.com
 

1903 births
1991 deaths
20th-century American actresses
American Academy of Dramatic Arts alumni
American television actresses
Actresses from Pennsylvania
American film actresses
American stage actresses
American radio actresses
British emigrants to the United States
Western (genre) film actresses